Kelly Yang (born August 29, 1984) is an Asian American writer and author of young adult and children's literature. She won the 2019 Asian/Pacific American Award for Literature of her novel, Front Desk and the 2018 Parents’ Choice Gold Medal for Fiction for her book Front Desk, a book based on her experiences as a 10-year-old working at her family's motel business.

Biography 
Kelly Yang was born in Hong Kong and emigrated to the United States with her family when she was young. She skipped several grades and attended University of California, Berkeley at the age of 13 and graduated with a bachelor's degree in political science. She then went on to Harvard Law School and graduated at the age of 20. Despite graduating with a Juris Doctor degree, she decided not to practice law.

Yang served as an editorial columnist for the South China Morning Post in Hong Kong from 2010 to 2018 and also founded an after-school writing program for children called The Kelly Yang Project.

Yang's first book, Front Desk, published in 2018, is for children and is based on her experience helping her parents manage hotels while growing up. It was followed by three sequels, Three Keys in 2020, Room to Dream in 2021 and Key Player in 2022. Her young adult book Parachutes is about sexual misconduct at an elite private school, and based on her own experiences at Harvard Law School.

Personal life
Yang has three children. She spends her time between San Francisco and Hong Kong.

Bibliography
Front Desk (2018)
 Three Keys (2020)
 Parachutes (2020)
Room to Dream (2021)
New From Here (2022)
Key Player (2022)
Finally Seen (2023)
Top Story (2023)

References

External links
 Official website

Created via preloaddraft
Harvard Law School alumni
University of California alumni
Living people
American women novelists
21st-century American women writers
Hong Kong people
American writers of Chinese descent
American children's writers
1984 births